The a'dungu, also called the ekidongo or ennenga, is a stringed musical instrument of the Alur people of northwestern Uganda. It is an arched harp of varying dimensions, ranging from seven to ten strings or more.

The physical form of the a'dungu African harp derives from uniquely African origins. The instrument is made of a hollowed-out slab of wood, which is covered by two pieces of leather, woven together in the center. The upper piece of leather functions as a soundboard, and a wooden rib supports it, serving also as a structure to secure the strings to the soundboard. A curved wooden neck, containing a tuning peg for each note, is inserted into the end of the instrument's body. The strings run diagonally from the tuning pegs in the neck to the rib in the center of the body.

The musical form commonly known as adungu music, is tuned to the diatonic major scale of classic European music and bears the influence of the British presence in Uganda. The a'dungu may be played alone, in an ensemble, or as vocal accompaniment. The instrument appears in various sizes that can be loosely categorized into soprano, alto, tenor, and bass. A'dungus are often played in quartets or quintets. The strings of the bass a'dungu are tuned only to the pitches of the tonic triad, and more notes can be played by placing the finger on a string any distance from the neck to raise the pitch. The tenor, alto, and soprano a'dungus are tuned to the pitches of a diatonic major scale. The bass and tenor instruments are played on the ground, while the alto and soprano are played held against the chest.

Tuning is not standardized, and players will usually tune by ear to each other shortly before a performance. The a'dungus are not in a particular key, and the tonality can be adapted to the preferences of the performers.

The a'dungu is generally not used melodically, and instead outlines chords. Generally, a single note is played at a time on the bass and tenor instruments, while the alto and soprano a'dungus are used to play triads. In performance, complex arpeggiation gives simple tonal chord progressions an energetic, sometimes syncopated rhythmic drive.

Modern performers adept with the adungu include the native Ugandan musician James Makubuya and the American artist Crystal Bright.

References

Arched harps
Ugandan musical instruments
African musical instruments